Brent Olynyk  (born December 7, 1971 in North Vancouver, British Columbia) is a badminton player from Canada, who won the gold medal in the men's doubles competition at the 1999 Pan American Games alongside Iain Sydie. He also took away silver from that tournament, won in the mixed doubles competition partnering Robbyn Hermitage. A resident of Calgary, Alberta, he represented Canada at the 2000 Summer Olympics.

References
 Canadian Olympic Committee

1971 births
Living people
Canadian male badminton players
Badminton players at the 2000 Summer Olympics
Olympic badminton players of Canada
Sportspeople from North Vancouver
Badminton players at the 1999 Pan American Games
Pan American Games gold medalists for Canada
Pan American Games silver medalists for Canada
Pan American Games medalists in badminton
Medalists at the 1999 Pan American Games